Ahmedwal Railway Station (Balochi:احمد وال ریلوے اسٹیشن) is located in Pakistan.

See also
 List of railway stations in Pakistan
 Pakistan Railways

References

Railway stations in Balochistan, Pakistan
Railway stations on Quetta–Taftan Railway Line